Damníkov is a municipality and village in Ústí nad Orlicí District in the Pardubice Region of the Czech Republic. It has about 700 inhabitants.

References

External links

 

Villages in Ústí nad Orlicí District